Arnel Jakupović (born 29 May 1998) is an Austrian footballer who plays as a forward for Slovenian PrvaLiga side Maribor.

Club career
On 21 July 2020, Jakupović moved to Domžale on a permanent basis.

References

External links
Arnel Jakupović at OEFB

1998 births
Living people
Austrian people of Bosnia and Herzegovina descent
Austrian footballers
Austria youth international footballers
Austria under-21 international footballers
Association football forwards
Empoli F.C. players
SK Sturm Graz players
NK Domžale players
NK Maribor players
Austrian Regionalliga players
Serie A players
Serie B players
Austrian Football Bundesliga players
Slovenian PrvaLiga players
Austrian expatriate footballers
Expatriate footballers in England
Expatriate footballers in Italy
Expatriate footballers in Slovenia
Austrian expatriate sportspeople in England
Austrian expatriate sportspeople in Italy
Austrian expatriate sportspeople in Slovenia